The landing at Amchitka was the amphibious landing operation and occupation of Amchitka island by American forces during the Aleutian Islands campaign.

Background 
In June 1942, the Japanese occupied some of the western Aleutian islands, and hoped to occupy Amchitka. A Japanese survey team scouted the island but rejected it for military purposes.

During the Aleutian campaign an air force base was needed near the occupied islands of Attu and Kiska. Amchitcka was ruled out as a possible candidate due to its close proximity only 50 miles away from the island of Kiska. At the War Department's suggestion, an initial reconnaissance of Amchitka was carried out in September 1942, which found that it would be difficult to build an airstrip on the island. Nevertheless, planners decided on December 13 that the airfield "had to be built" to prevent the Japanese from doing the same. A further reconnaissance mission visited Amchitka from 17 to 19 December, and reported that a fighter strip could be built in two to three weeks, and a main airfield in three to four months.  In December 1942, plans were drawn out for the landings dubbed "Operation Longview". The operation would scrape together 2,000 immediate U.S military in the Aleutian Islands by the Alaska Defense Command. It was thought through reconnaissance that Amchitka was occupied by a small Japanese military presence. Eager to remove the Japanese, the Joint Chiefs of Staff agreed to move quickly to regain the territory.

Landing at Constantine Harbor 
The operation was set for January 9, but delayed due to the weather conditions.

American forces made the unopposed landing on the island on January 12, 1943, three days later. Nearly 2,100 troops disembarked in Constantine Harbor without opposition. Their only enemies were the weather, the unpredictable current, and the rock-studded waters through which the landing was made. The destroyer maneuvered into the rock-edged harbor and stayed there until the last men had landed and then turned to the business of clearing the harbor. A strong current, however, swept Worden onto a pinnacle that tore into a hull beneath the engine room and caused a complete loss of power. The destroyer then broached and began breaking up in the surf; Comdr. William G. Pogue, the destroyer's commanding officer, ordered abandon ship; and, as he was directing that effort, was swept overboard into the wintry seas by a heavy wave that broke over the ship. Pogue was among the fortunate ones, however, because he was hauled, unconscious, out of the sea. Fourteen of the crew drowned.

Once on the ground the island was cleared and found to be empty of Japanese military. During the first night ashore a "willowaw" (a violent squall) smashed many of the landing boats and swept a troop transport aground. On the second day a blizzard wracked the island with snow, sleet, and biting wind. Lasting for nearly two weeks, the blizzard finally subsided enough to reveal to a Japanese scout plane from Kiska the American beachhead on Amchitka. Harassed by bombing and strafing attacks from Kiska, engineers continued work on an airfield on Amchitka, completing it in mid-February. Japanese attacks on the island then sharply declined. By February 16, the fighter strip was ready for limited operation. On that day, eight P-40s arrived on Amchitka, and, within a week, they were running patrols over Kiska.

The stage was now set for the next phase of operations, amphibious attacks to eject the Japanese from their Aleutian footholds.

See also 
 Battle of Attu
 Military history of the Aleutian Islands
 Operation Cottage

References 

Aleutian Islands campaign
Amchitka
January 1943 events
Amchitka